The Argentina national volleyball team represents Argentina in international men's volleyball and is controlled by the Argentine Volleyball Federation (Federación del Voleibol Argentino in Spanish, and abbreviated "FeVA").

The Argentina team made their international debut at the South American Championship in Rio de Janeiro in 1951, claiming fourth place. They competed in their first World Championship 1960 in the same city, where they finished 11th.
The team's best achievements are the bronze medal at the 1982 World Championship, the bronze medal at the 1988 Summer Olympics and two gold medals at the 1995 and 2015 Pan American Games. Throughout the 1990s it was usually ranked among the first ten.

In recent years, though without achieving any medal, the team finished 4th at the 2000 and 5th at the 2004, 2012 and 2016 Summer Olympics. However, they achieved another milestone of achievement when they won another Bronze medal at the Volleyball at the 2020 Summer Olympics

At continental level, overshadowed by volleyball power Brazil, Argentina won the gold medal at the 1964 South American Men's Volleyball Championship, twelve silvers and seven bronzes.
Volleyball was introduced in Argentina by the YMCA - Youth Christian Association in 1912.  The Argentine Volleyball Federation was created in 1932, sharing the same management as Basketball. The number of fans slowly started to grow as a result of its broadcasting.

Results

Summer Olympics

World Championship
1960 — 11th place
1978 — 22nd place
1982 —  Bronze
1986 — 7th place
1990 — 6th place
1994 — 14th place
1998 — 11th place
2002 — 4th place
2006 — 13th place
2010 — 9th place
2014 — 11th place
2018 — 15th place
2022 — 8th place

World Cup
1995 — 7th place
1999 — 9th place
2007 — 7th place
2011 — 7th place
2015 — 5th place
2019 — 5th place

World League
1990 to 1995 — did not compete
1996 — 7th place
1997 — 8th place
1998 — 9th place
1999 — 6th place
2000 — 8th place
2001 — 13th place
2002 — 9th place
2005 — 10th place
2006 — 7th place
2007 — 13th place
2009 — 5th place
2010 — 5th place
2011 — 4th place
2012 — 10th place
2013 — 6th place
2014 — 13th place
2015 — 11th place
2016 — 10th place
2017 — 10th place

Nations League
2018 — 14th place
2019 — 7th place
2021 — 9th place
2022 — 9th place

World Grand Champions Cup
1993 to 1997 — did not compete
2001 — 6th place
2005 to 2017 — did not compete

Pan American Games
1955 — not participate
1959 — not participate
1963 —  Bronze
1967 — 7th place
1971 — 6th place
1975 — not participate
1979 — not participate
1983 —  Bronze
1987 — to be confirmed
1991 —  Bronze
1995 —  Gold
1999 — 4th place
2003 — not participate
2007 — 6th place
2011 —  Bronze
2015 —  Gold
2019 —  Gold

America Cup
1998 —  Silver
1999 —  Bronze
2000 — 4th place
2001 —  Bronze
2005 — 4th place
2007 — 4th place
2008 — 4th place

Pan-American Cup
2010 —  Silver
2011 — 7th place
2012 —  Silver
2013 —  Bronze
2014 —  Bronze
2015 —  Silver
2016 —  Silver
2017 —  Gold
2018 —  Gold
2019 —  Silver

Team

Current squad

The following is the Argentine roster in the 2022 World Championship.
 
Head coach:  Marcelo Mendez

Notable players

Marcos Milinkovic
Waldo Kantor
Javier Weber
Daniel Castellani
Hugo Conte
Raúl Quiroga
Jon Uriarte

Kit providers
The table below shows the history of kit providers for the Argentina national volleyball team.

Sponsorship
Primary sponsors include: main sponsors like Banco de la Nación Argentina and Sonder, other sponsors: Pensma, Sodimac, Arnet, Enardo, Gatorade and universal assistance.

References

External links

 
 FIVB profile

National men's volleyball teams
Volleyball
Mens National Team
Men's sport in Argentina